Balsa de Ves comes from a village population dependent See, which was later called Villa de Ves, on being granted a charter by Alfonso X the Wise.
Under this jurisdiction, was comparable to that account, and was awarded a February 22, 1272, were granted to the inhabitants of see the power to work the land on their own, as previously depended on the Crown.
The application of immunity caused an exodus to the land of the plain, where there are currently stocks Balsa de Ves (The Wall, El Viso and The Cantoblanco), Casas de Ves and Villar de Ves (Villa de Ves). This exodus resulted in a growth in importance and people of Casas de Ves until 1745 when the Mayor is installed in this population, becoming dependent on this raft populations and Villa de Ves.
In 1820, he separated from Casas de Ves the Villa de Ves, to rejoin again in 1823 and finally separated in 1838.
In 1844, definitively separates Balsa de Ves, this being the official birth year of Balsa de Ves as a municipality.
Cave unproven legend highlighting as the origin of the name "Ves", supposedly born the cry of advancing troops against Muslim Christians.

Source: Juan Gomez Penalver (retired Secretary of the City Council of Casa de Ves)

Balsa de Ves is a municipality in Albacete, Castile-La Mancha, Spain. It has a population of 226.

See also
Manchuela

References

External links 
La Manchuela - Balsa de Ves

Municipalities of the Province of Albacete